Gerome Giudice (born March 11, 1989) is a Canadian former professional ice hockey left winger who last played for the Coventry Blaze in the Elite Ice Hockey League in the United Kingdom.

Career statistics

References

External links

1989 births
Living people
Canadian ice hockey left wingers
Canadian people of Italian descent
Coventry Blaze players
Ice hockey people from Ontario
Muskegon Lumberjacks players
SHC Fassa players
Sudbury Wolves players
Tulsa Oilers (1992–present) players
Canadian expatriate ice hockey players in England
Canadian expatriate ice hockey players in Italy
Canadian expatriate ice hockey players in the United States